Seyyed Hashemi (also Romanized as Seyyed Hāshemī and Seid Hashemi; also known as Seyyed Hāshem and Seyyed Hāshen) is a village in Alamarvdasht Rural District, Alamarvdasht District, Lamerd County, Fars Province, Iran. At the 2006 census, its population was 291, in 65 families.

References 

Populated places in Lamerd County